Walter Roman may refer to:

 Valter Roman, Romanian communist activist and soldier
 Walter G. Roman, American engineer and inventor
 Walter Romanowicz, American soccer goalkeeper
 Walter Roman (rugby), English rugby union and rugby league footballer